Jimmy Levale Speigner (born  September 24, 1980 in Thomasville, Georgia) is an American former Major League Baseball relief pitcher who played for the Washington Nationals. Speigner attended college, and played NCAA ball for four years, at Auburn University.

Professional career
After the season, he was selected by the Washington Nationals as a Rule 5 Draft pick.

Speigner worked as a middle reliever and appeared in 12 games in 2007, with a respectable 3.77 ERA through mid-May. But by then, four of the National's five starters were on the disabled list, and, Speigner, along with a few other Nats relievers, was pressed into service as a starter. From May 16 through June 2, Speigner started four times, each time a disaster. His longest outing was 4 innings, and over the four-game span compiled a record of 0-2 and an ERA of 14.44. In his June 2 start, however, while he gave up 6 runs on 6 hits in the first inning, he then retired 10 of the final 11 batters he faced.  This gave Manager Manny Acta enough confidence to try Speigner one more time. On June 9, facing two-time Cy Young award winner Johan Santana, Speigner threw a gem, six innings, two hits, and one run, earning a 3-1 victory over the Minnesota Twins.  Speigner gave credit to pitching coach Randy St. Claire for correcting a number of errors. But he followed that with a game against the Toronto Blue Jays in which he surrendered seven runs in 3 innings. Three days later, he appeared in relief and surrendered 2 runs in 2 innings, and the following day he was designated for assignment. The Nationals and the Twins worked out a deal allowing the Nationals to send Speigner to Triple-A Columbus. The Nationals gave up minor league outfielder Darnell McDonald.

Personal Life

Speigner currently lives just outside of his college alma mater, (Auburn), in Opelika, Alabama, with his wife, Perri Wilson Speigner, along with their two children, Campbell and Grant, where he coaches baseball. Both in little leagues with his son, as well as at the high school level.

References

External links

1980 births
Living people
Washington Nationals players
Auburn Tigers baseball players
Baseball players from Georgia (U.S. state)
Major League Baseball pitchers
Elizabethton Twins players
Fort Myers Miracle players
Quad Cities River Bandits players
Rochester Red Wings players
New Britain Rock Cats players
Columbus Clippers players
Harrisburg Senators players
Jacksonville Suns players
New Orleans Zephyrs players
Tacoma Rainiers players
Atenienses de Manatí (baseball) players
Gigantes de Carolina players
Lobos de Arecibo players